Private Bom (Swedish: Soldat Bom) is a 1948 Swedish comedy film directed by Lars-Eric Kjellgren and starring Nils Poppe, Inga Landgré and Gunnar Björnstrand. The film's sets were designed by the art director Nils Svenwall. It was part of a series starring Poppe as Fabian Bom.

Cast
 Nils Poppe as 	Fabian Bom
 Inga Landgré as Agnes
 Gunnar Björnstrand as 	Korpral Berglund
 Julia Cæsar as 	Carolina Hård
 Douglas Håge as 	Major Killman
 Naima Wifstrand as Översköterskan
 Gunnel Wadner as 	Gabriella Killman
 Gösta Cederlund as 	Översten
 Ludde Juberg as 	Zakarias
 Åke Jensen as 	Löjtnant Forsberg
 Nils Hallberg as 	Kalle
 Nils Jacobsson as Militärläkaren
 Karl Erik Flens as 	Korpralen
 Wiktor Andersson as 	Lokföraren 
 Astrid Bodin as 	Kvinnan vid porten
 Ernst Brunman as 	Karl Gustafsson 
 Carl Deurell as Prästen
 Carl-Axel Elfving as 	Soldat på väg till dansbanan 
 Stig Ossian Ericson as 	Tjänstemannen 
 Erna Groth as 	Sjuksyster
 Torsten Lilliecrona as 	Inskrivningsofficeren 
 Margreth Weivers as 	Receptionisten
 Birger Åsander as 	Officer

References

Bibliography 
 Qvist, Per Olov & von Bagh, Peter. Guide to the Cinema of Sweden and Finland. Greenwood Publishing Group, 2000.

External links 
 

1948 films
Swedish comedy films
1948 comedy films
1940s Swedish-language films
Films directed by Lars-Eric Kjellgren
1940s Swedish films